In game theory, a satisfaction equilibrium is a solution concept for a class of non-cooperative games, namely games in satisfaction form. Games in satisfaction form model situations in which players aim at satisfying a given individual constraint, e.g., a performance metric must be smaller or bigger than a given threshold. When a player satisfies its own constraint, the player is said to be satisfied. A satisfaction equilibrium, if it exists, arises when all players in the game are satisfied.

History 

The term Satisfaction equilibrium (SE) was first used  to refer to the stable point of a dynamic interaction between players that are learning an equilibrium by taking actions and observing their own payoffs. The equilibrium lies on the satisfaction principle, which stipulates that an agent that is satisfied with its current payoff does not change its current action.

Later, the notion of satisfaction equilibrium was introduced as a solution concept for Games in satisfaction form.
Such solution concept was introduced in the realm of electrical engineering for the analysis of quality of service (QoS) in Wireless ad hoc networks. In this context, radio devices (network components) are modelled as players that decide upon their own operating configurations in order to satisfy some targeted QoS. 

Games in satisfaction form and the notion of satisfaction equilibrium have been used  in the context of the fifth generation of cellular communications (5G) for tackling the problem of energy efficiency,
 
spectrum sharing

and transmit power control.

In the smart grid, games in satisfaction form have been used for modelling the problem of data injection attacks.

Games in Satisfaction Form 

In static games of complete, perfect information, a satisfaction-form representation of a game is a specification of the set of players, the players' action sets and their preferences. The preferences for a given player are determined by a mapping, often referred to as the preference mapping, from the Cartesian product of all the other players' action sets to the given player's power set of actions. That is, given the actions adopted by all the other players, the preference mapping determines the subset of actions with which the player is satisfied. 

Definition [Games in Satisfaction Form]
A game in satisfaction form is described by a tuple 

The preference mapping 
 
determines the set of actions with which player  is satisfied given the actions played by all the other players.

In contrast to other existing game formulations, e.g., normal form and normal form with constrained action sets, the notion of performance optimization, i.e., utility maximization or cost minimization, is not present. Games in satisfaction-form model the case in which players adopt their actions aiming to satisfy a specific individual constraint given the actions adopted by all the other players. An important remark is that, players are assumed to be careless of whether other players can satisfy or not their individual constraints.

Satisfaction Equilibrium 
An action profile is a tuple . The action profile in which all players are satisfied is an equilibrium of the corresponding game in satisfaction form. At a satisfaction equilibrium, players do not exhibit a particular interest in changing its current action.

Definition [Satisfaction Equilibrium in Pure Strategies]
The action profile  is a satisfaction equilibrium in pure strategies for the game  if for all ,
.

Satisfaction Equilibrium in Mixed Strategies

Denote by  the probability distribution (mixed strategy) adopted by player  to choose its actions. For all ,  represents the probability with which player  chooses action . The notation  represents the mixed strategies of all players except that of player .

Definition [Extension to Mixed Strategies of the Satisfaction Form ]
The extension in mixed strategies of the game 
 is described by the tuple , 
where the correspondence

determines the set of all possible probability distributions that allow player  to choose an action that satisfies its individual conditions with probability one, that is,
 

A satisfaction equilibrium in mixed strategies is defined as follows.

Definition [Satisfaction Equilibrium in Mixed Strategies]
The mixed strategy profile  is an SE in mixed strategies if for all ,
.

Let the -th action of player , i.e., be associated with the unitary vector , where, all the components are zero except its -th component, which is equal to one. The vector  represents a degenerated probability distribution, where the action  is deterministically chosen. Using this argument, it becomes clear that every satisfaction equilibrium in pure strategies of the game   is also a satisfaction equilibrium in mixed strategies of the game .

At an SE of the game 
, 
players choose their actions following a probability distribution such that only action profiles that allow all players to simultaneously satisfy their individual conditions with probability one are played with positive probability.  Hence, in the case in which one  SE in pure strategies does not exist, then, it does not exist a SE in mixed  strategies in the game  
.

ε-Satisfaction Equilibrium  

This observation leads to the definition of a solution concept known as -satisfaction equilibrium (-SE). 

Definition: [ε-Satisfaction Equilibrium]
Let  satisfy . The mixed strategy profile   
is an epsilon-satisfaction equilibrium (-SE) of the game 
, 
if for all , it follows that
,
where

From the definition above,  it can be implied that if the mixed strategy profile  is an -SE, it holds that,

That is, players are unsatisfied with probability . The relevance of the -SE is that it models the fact that players can be tolerant a certain unsatisfaction level.
.

In contrast to the conditions for the existence of a SE in either pure or mixed strategies, the conditions for the existence of an  -SE are mild. 
 

Proposition [Existence of an -SE]
Let 
, 
be a finite game in satisfaction form. Then, if for all , there always exists an action profile  such that 
,
then there always exists a strategy profile

Equilibrium Selection  

Games in satisfaction form might exhibit  several satisfaction equilibria. In such a case, players might associate to each of their own actions a value representing the effort or cost to play such action. From this perspective, if several SEs exist, players might prefer the one that requires the lowest  (global or individual) effort or cost.  
To model this preference, games in satisfaction form might be equipped with cost functions for each of the players. 

For all  , let the function  determine the effort or cost paid by player  for using  each of its actions. More specifically,  given a pair of actions ,  the action  is preferred against  by player  if

Note that this preference  for player  is independent of the actions adopted by all the other players. 

Definition: [Efficient Satisfaction Equilibrium (ESE)]
Let  be the set of satisfaction equilibria in pure strategies of the game in satisfaction form
.  
The strategy profile   
is an efficient satisfaction equilibrium 
if for all , it follows that
.

In the trivial case in which for all  the function  is a constant function,  the set of ESE and the set of SE are identical. This highlights  the relevance  of the ability of players to differentiate the effort of playing one action or another in order to select one (satisfaction) equilibrium among all the existing equilibria. 
 
In games in satisfaction form with nonempty sets of satisfaction equilibria,  when all players assign different costs to its actions, i.e.,  for all  and for all  ,  it holds that , there always exists an ESE.  Nonetheless, it is not necessarily unique, which implies that there still exists room for other equilibrium refinements beyond the notion of individual cost functions.

Generalizations 

Games in satisfaction form for which it does not exists an action profile in which all players are satisfied are said not to possess a satisfaction equilibrium. If players in the set  cannot be satisfied by any of its actions given the actions of all the other players, these players are not interested in changing its current action. This implies that action profiles that satisfy this condition are also equilibria. This is because none of the players is particularly interested in changing their current actions, even those that are unsatisfied. This reasoning led to another solution concept known as generalized satisfaction equilibrium (GSE).
This generalization is proposed in the context of a novel game formulation, namely the generalized satisfaction form.

Definition: [Generalized Satisfaction Form]
A game in generalized satisfaction form is described by a tuple
,
,
determines the set of probability mass functions (mixed strategies) with support  that satisfy player  given the mixed strategies adopted by all the other players. 

The generalized satisfaction equilibrium is defined as follows.

 
Definition: [Generalized Satisfaction Equilibrium (GSE)]
The mixed strategy profile  is a generalized satisfaction equilibrium of the game in generalized satisfaction form 
  
(i) For all  , ; and 
(ii)For all  ,  

Note that the GSE boils down to the notion of -SE of the game in satisfaction form 
 
when,  and for all , the correspondence  is chosen to be

Finally, note that any SE is a GSE, but the converse is not true.

References 

Game theory
Game theory equilibrium concepts